Khoren Sargsian (1891–1970) was an Armenian writer, critic, doctor of philology, and professor. He graduated from Saint Petersburg University and later went on to become the director of the Literature Institute of the Armenian SA from 1943 to 1947. He authored many publications on famous Armenian figures such as Vahan Terian, Levon Shant, Stepan Zoryan, and Sayat-Nova.

Sources
 Armenian Concise Encyclopedia, Ed. by acad. K. Khudaverdian, Yerevan, 1990, p. 484
 

Soviet literary critics
Soviet academics
Soviet philosophers
Armenian literary critics
Armenian academics
20th-century Armenian philosophers
1970 deaths
1891 births